Louis Alphonse van Gasteren (20 November 1922 – 10 May 2016) was a Dutch film director, film producer, and artist. He was born in Amsterdam. He is the son of actor Louis van Gasteren Sr. and singer Elise Menagé Challa, and the brother of actress Josephine van Gasteren.

Biography
Van Gasteren trained as an electrician. He worked for the Dutch Polygoon newsreel company in Haarlem, Netherlands in 1949. In 1951 he started his own film production company Spectrum Film. He made his debut with Brown Gold, a film about cocoa and chocolate, in 1952. In 1983 Van Gasteren won the Dutch Film Critics Award for best documentary as well as the Golden Calf for best picture for Hans: Het Leven Voor De Dood (Hans, Life Before Death). He received the Golden Calf a second time in 2003 for his documentary The Price of Survival. Van Gasteren was a visiting professor in the United States at UCLA and Carpenter Center for the Visual Arts at Harvard University. Van Gasteren lived in Amsterdam and was married to Joke Meerman. At the end of his life he was the oldest active filmmaker in the Netherlands.

Walter Oettinger 
During the Second World War Van Gasteren was convicted to four years for killing Walter Oettinger, a German Jew in hiding. After the war Van Gasteren was pardoned, but when he claimed a special pension for resistance fighters, this was denied on the grounds that the killing of Oettinger had not been an act of resistance.

Filmography

A partial list:

 1952 – Bruin goud (Brown Gold) – Documentary about cocoa and chocolate, shot on location in Ghana and the Netherlands, directed by Theo van Haren Noman (nl). 90 min
 1954 – Railplan 68 (Rail Plan 68) – Documentary about the nightly replacement of tram rails on the Leidseplein in Amsterdam, 15 min
 1955 – Vliegende schotels geland (Flying saucers landed) – Surprising commercial for Albert Heyn's Boffie Coffee, run as film, 4 min
 1960 – Stranding (Stranded) – Thriller, An international gang of bank-robbers escape to Ecuador on the ship, but after a shipwreck become stranded on the island of Terschelling, 90 min
 1960 – Een nieuw dorp op nieuw land (A new village on new land) – Documentary about design, construction and first inhabitants of the village of Nagele in the newly reclaimed northeast, 25 min
 1961 – Alle vogels hebben nesten (All Birds Have Nests) – Documentary on the system-building as a result of the post-war housing shortage. 25 min.
 1962 – Het huis (The House) - Short film concerning a house which is demolished at the same time it is built, conceived by intercutting two time periods.  No dialogue. 32 min.
 1963 – Mayday - Documentary about the successes and failures of rescues at sea. 20 min.
 1964 – Er is telefoon voor u (There's a Phone-call for You) - Documentary about the effects of the telephone in the Netherlands. 46 min.
 1964 – Jazz and Poetry, 14 min.
 1965 – Out of My Skull – Early Dutch experimental film, made during a stay as visiting professor at Harvard University. 15 min.
 1968 – Report from Biafra - Documentary concerning the Biafran War. 50 min.
 1969 – Begrijpt U Nu Waarom Ik Huil? (Now Do You Get It Why I Am Crying?) – A therapeutic LSD-session with a former inmate of a German concentration camp. 62 min.
 1971 – Report from Europe - Film concerning the structure of the European community
 1973 – On ne sait pas – Portrait of a French country woman. 13 min
 1974 – Multinationals – Documentary concerning the role of multinational ventures
 1975 – Do You Get It no.2 – Second of a series concerning perception and interpretation. Louis analyzes film footage of a policeman directing traffic and construction workers with shovels who try to make themselves immortal by their actions when they notice the presence of the camera. 13 min.
 1975 - Corbeddu – The first of three films about Sardinia. Can the bandit Corbeddu be regarded as the Robin Hood of Sardinia? 72 min
 1976 – Salude e libertade – History and culture of Sardinia. 52 min.
 1980 – Wirbula flow forms – Film concerning the water art of John Wilks. 10 min.
 1983 – Hans: Het Leven Voor De Dood (Hans, Life Before Death) – A documentary/feature on the life of the young composer Hans van Sweeden and those who knew him intimately. Won Golden Calf and Dutch Critics Award in 1983. 155 min.
 1989 – Een zaak van niveau (A Matter of Level) – 1000 years of Dutch water management and hydro civil engineering. Golden Camera Award Chicago, Sony Video Award,  Film Prize from Amsterdam fund for art, Special Commendation Prix Futura Berlin. 56 min.
1994 – Why Do Pigeons Home? – An experiment with mobile pigeon lofts, registered at the campus of the University of Utrecht. 30 min.
 1997 – Beyond Words - Interview with Indian master Meher Baba, shot in 1967. 38 min.
 2002 – In een Japanese stroomversnelling – (In Japanese Rapids) a film concerning the role of Dutch engineers in Japan in the 19th century. 85 min.
 2003 – The Price of Survival (De prijs van overleven) – A follow up of the 1969 film Do You Understand Now Why I Cry?, about the children of the survivors of World War II. 56 min.
 2005 – Het verdriet van Roermond (The grief of Roermond) – Four-part series on the execution of fourteen civilians in Roermond on December 26, 1944 and its consequences, 4 x 50 min
 2006 – Het verdriet van Roermond (The grief of Roermond) – Short version of the four-part series, 90 min
 2012 – Nema Aviona za Zagreb (There is no plane for Zagreb) – Autobiographical drama/documentary against background of the 1960s, featuring interviews with Meher Baba and Timothy Leary. 82 min.

Visual Arts

 Car Sculpture in Tele Creation, 1964
 Matter Paintings, Stedelijk Museum Amsterdam (New League Images), 1966
 Multi Pels, Van Abbemuseum, Eindhoven, 1967: targets of the Milwaukee Police Department
 Matter paintings and multiples, Fodor Museum Amsterdam, 1968
 Sunny Implo (with Fred Wessels), Stedelijk Museum Amsterdam, 1970
 Roots of the City, Nieuwmarkt metro station, opening in 1980
 Furnishing Neeltje Jans (with Wilhelm Holzbauer, Frei Otto, Martin Manning), 1987
 Normal Amsterdam Level (Kees van der Veer), City Hall / Music Theatre, opening in 1988

References

Further reading
 Filming for the Future The Work of Louis van Gasteren by Patricia Pisters, Amsterdam University Press (2015)

External links

  
 

1922 births
2016 deaths
Dutch documentary filmmakers
Dutch artists
Artists from Amsterdam
Golden Calf winners